Villafeliche is a municipality located in the province of Zaragoza, Aragon, Spain. According to the 2004 census (INE), the municipality has a population of 226 inhabitants.

Twin cities
 Colfelice

References

Municipalities in the Province of Zaragoza